or Iwate-Hanamaki Airport  is a regional airport located  north-northeast of the city of Hanamaki, Iwate Prefecture, in the Tohoku region of northern Japan.

History
Hanamaki Airport opened in 1964 with a 1200-meter runway, which was extended to 2000 meters in 1983. On 4 April 2009, a new terminal building was opened on the opposite side of the runway, replacing the now-defunct old terminal building that is situated next to Route 4. Due to this change, Nitanai Station  became the nearest train station to the terminal building; however, there is no bus or taxi service at that station, and Hanamaki-Kūkō Station remains the most convenient for access.

Airlines and destinations

Accidents and incidents
April 18, 1993, Japan Air System Flight 451: A Douglas DC-9-41 of Japan Air System, flying from Nagoya to Hanamaki, crashed after the aircraft, caught by wind shear, skidded off of the runway while landing at Hanamaki Airport. All of the passengers and crew survived.

References

External links

 Hanamaki Airport (Official site) 
 Iwate-Hanamaki Airport Guide from Japan Airlines First 2 floors only (English)
 Iwate-Hanamaki Airport Guide 
 
 

Airports in Japan
Transport in Iwate Prefecture
Buildings and structures in Iwate Prefecture
1964 establishments in Japan
Airports established in 1964
Hanamaki, Iwate